Ronja Eibl (born August 1999) is a German cross-country cyclist.

She participated at the 2018 UCI Mountain Bike World Championships, winning a silver medal.
She won the 2019 overall UCI Mountain Bike World Cup in U23, winning 3 rounds (Andorra, Les Gets, Val di Sole).

References

External links

1999 births
Living people
German female cyclists
German mountain bikers
Cyclists at the 2020 Summer Olympics
Olympic cyclists of Germany
People from Balingen
Sportspeople from Tübingen (region)
Cyclists from Baden-Württemberg
21st-century German women